Liberator or The Liberators or variation, may refer to:

Literature
 The Liberators (Suvorov book), a 1981 book by Victor Suvorov
 The Liberators (comic book), a British comic book
 The Liberator, a Paris-based journal that published an article about King George V that led to the 1911 libel conviction of Edward Mylius
 Liberators, a 2009 novel by James Wesley Rawles, from the Patriots series

Film
 The Liberator (film), a 2013 film
 The Liberator (miniseries), a 2020 Netflix miniseries
 "The Liberator", a 1954 episode of the Hallmark Hall of Fame
 Liberators: Fighting on Two Fronts in World War II, a 1992 documentary

Media
 The Liberator (newspaper) (1831–1865), an American abolitionist newspaper
 The Liberator (magazine) (1918–24), an American monthly communist periodical
 Liberator (magazine), a British magazine of radical liberalism founded in 1970
 The Liberator Magazine, an American magazine first published in 2002
 The Liberator, the school newspaper of Liberal Arts and Sciences Academy in Austin, Texas

Individuals and groups
 Alexander II of Russia (1818–1881), Emperor of Russia, also known as Alexander the Liberator
 Daniel O'Connell (1775–1847), Irish statesman known as "the Liberator"
 José de San Martín (1778–1850), known as "El Libertador" in Spanish
 Liberatores, the assassins of Julius Caesar
 Libertadores, the principal leaders of the Latin American wars of independence from Spain and Portugal
 Pedro I of Brazil (1798–1834), founder and first ruler of the Empire of Brazil, nicknamed "the Liberator"
 Saint Liberator (died 121), Christian martyr
 Simón Bolívar (1783–1830), known as "El Libertador" in Spanish
 14th Armored Division (United States), nicknamed "The Liberators"
 5th Infantry Division (Philippines), nicknamed "Liberator"
 Liberators (American band)
 Liberator (band), a Swedish ska band formed in 1994

Popular culture
 Liberator (album), a 1993 album by Orchestral Manoeuvres in the Dark
 Liberator (Nedor Comics), a Nedor Comics superhero from the Golden Age of Comics
 Liberator (video game), a 1982 arcade game by Atari Games
 The Liberators (Ultimate Marvel), the Ultimate Marvel incarnation of the Masters of Evil
 Liberators (video game), a World War II strategy game by Mutantbox

Firearms
 Liberator (gun), the world's first fully 3D printable gun, made by Defense Distributed
 FP-45 Liberator, a pistol manufactured for the United States military during World War II designed by George Hyde
 Winchester Liberator, a derringer shotgun

Other uses
 Liberator (Honeywell), a binary translator program for the Honeywell 200 in the 1960s
 Consolidated B-24 Liberator, a United States heavy bomber of World War II era
 Thorn EMI Liberator, a laptop-type portable word processor produced in the mid-1980s
 USS Liberator, several ships
 "Liberator", nickname of the Harley-Davidson WLA
 Liberator, a spacecraft in the British science-fiction television series Blake's 7

See also
 
 Liberation (disambiguation)
 Liberatore (disambiguation)